István Kiss (May 4, 1857 – January 9, 1902) was a Hungarian architect.

Kiss was born in Körösladány.  He finished his studies at Budapest University in 1880 and, between 1882 and 1885, travelled overseas on state scholarship. He subsequently gained teaching qualifications In the 1890s he mainly built judicial and  court buildings. The most significant of these are in Braşov, Oradea, Banská Bystrica and Locs.  He died in Budapest, aged 44.

Major works

Veszprém County Hall
Komárom Court House
Kalocsa Court House
Oradea Court House
Miskolc Court House
Zrenjanin Finance palace
Zrenjanin Trade academy
Budapest Baross street maternity clinic and Budapest St. John hospital.

References

Hungarian architects
People from Körösladány
1857 births
1902 deaths